Xingcheng, former name Ningyuan, is a county-level city of southwest Liaoning province, China, with a population of approximately 140,000 urban inhabitants, and is located on the Liaodong Bay, i.e. the northern coast of the Bohai Sea. Currently under the administration of Huludao City, the area is steeped in history, and contains one of the best preserved Ming Dynasty towns in China, as well as functioning as a laidback summer resort.

Historical Importance
Xingcheng has a long and distinguished history, and was established as a county as far back as the Liao Dynasty in CE 990. After being dissolved by the Yuan, it was resurrected during the Ming Dynasty under the name Ningyuan, and gained strategic importance as the first defensive outpost outside the Great Wall. Xingcheng's city walls have stood since they were first constructed in 1428 and were instrumental in helping the Ming defeat the great Manchu commander Nurhaci at the pivotal Battle of Ningyuan in 1626.

Tourist Destination
In modern times Xingcheng has become a mecca for those seeking relief from the bustling heat of summer in the overcrowded cities of Northern China.  The town has attractive swimming beaches and is also blessed with natural hot springs, discovered during the Tang Dynasty. For this reason, a number of spa resorts and sanatoriums have sprung up and the town has been marketed as a health destination, and is frequented by groups of Party cadres on government sponsored training courses during the summer. Xingcheng is home to the largest island in the Bohai Gulf, the beautiful and secluded Juhua Island, once a sanctuary for the Prince of Yan on the run from the ruthless Qin Shihuang.  A boat provides access to the island from the passenger terminal at the wharf, where local fisherman dock.

The Xingcheng seaside draws quite a crowd for swimming and other water sports and recreational activities during the summer.  Its entrance is marked by a large statue of a local goddess.  A pier connecting reef-top pavilions and a temple are located at the south end of the beach.

Liaoning Finance and Trade College in Xingcheng hosted events for the city's first International Swimsuit Festival on August 16, 2011.  This event follows the city's receipt of the honorary title “Chinese Swimwear Town” by the China National Textile & Apparel Council and China Garment Association in 2010 for the city's noteworthy swimsuit manufacture.

The old town of Xingcheng is the best preserved of four Ming Dynasty cities in China that retain their original and complete city walls, and is a treasure trove of traditional Ming architecture, containing historical remnants such as the Confucius Temple, the oldest temple in Northeast China and the largest ancient building in Liaoning.

Shoushan, a mountain located in the east end of Xingcheng, is open to the public for recreation.  Visitors can hike to its summit.  The area around it features temples on adjacent hills.

Transportation
Xingcheng is served by rail lines and bus routes that make it accessible from other larger cities.  Huludao, a short taxi ride away, also features high-speed rail and other rail lines and additional bus routes.

Taxis are metered and are typically easy to hail with fares starting at 5 RMB.

The city also provides bus service about twelve hours a day for a fare of 1 RMB per passenger.  Routes 1 and 2 connect the east end near the coast to the heart of the city's commercial activity in Nanguan in the old town and the rail and bus stations on the west end.

The closest airport is Jinzhou Airport.

Administrative divisions
There are seven subdistricts, four towns, and two townships, and 15 ethnic townships under the city's administration.

Townships:

Climate

See also
Battle of Ningyuan
Liaoning Finance and Trade College

References

External links

Official website of Xingcheng Government
http://www.liaoning-gateway.com/gateway/tourism/392/1985892.shtml/Ancient City Xingcheng

Cities in Liaoning
County-level divisions of Liaoning
Huludao